"Como Tu Mujer" (English: As Your Woman) is a song and title track written and produced by Mexican singer-songwriter Marco Antonio Solís and first recorded by Spanish performer Rocío Dúrcal. It was released in 1988 as the first single from studio album Como Tu Mujer (1988), this would be the first album produced by Solís for the singer. This song became a hit all over Latin America and in the United States where it went on to number-one for 10 consecutive weeks. This song is considered by some to be one of her most successful singles. This song earned her many awards such as the Premio Aplauso FM 98, given by "Spanish Broadcasting System", in Los Angeles, California and Premio TV y Novelas for 'Best Female Artist'.

Charts

Weekly charts

All-time charts

References

1988 songs
2011 songs
Rocío Dúrcal songs
Marco Antonio Solís songs
Jenni Rivera songs 
Songs written by Marco Antonio Solís
1988 singles
RCA Records singles